Armand Philip Schaubroeck (born January 20, 1944) is an American rock musician, radio host, and frontman of the band Armand Schaubroeck Steals. He is the co-owner of the House of Guitars in his hometown of Rochester, New York.

Schaubroeck hosts "Armand Schaubroeck Spins Vinyl" every Saturday at 3pm on WRFZ in Rochester, NY. The new weekly episode airs two other times each week on Rochester Free Radio (WRFZ). Tuesdays at 1pm and late Thursday into Friday at midnight.
Older episodes air at midnight late Monday thru Wednesday.
His show specializes in the music he has listened to in his lifetime.

Discography
 A Lot of People Would Like to See Armand Schaubroeck ... DEAD (1975)
 I Came to Visit; But Decided to Stay (1977)
 Live at the Holiday Inn (1978)
 Shakin' Shakin' (1978)
 Ratfucker (1978)

References

External links
 
 Trouser Press article on Armand Schaubroeck Steals
 Armand Schaubroeck  at AllMusic
 http://www.democratandchronicle.com/story/lifestyle/music/2014/04/21/house-guitars-finds-place-hall-fame/7985395/

1944 births
Living people
American DJs
American rock musicians